Derk is a Dutch masculine given name. Notable people with the name include:

Derk Bodde (1909-2003), American Sinologist
Derk Boerrigter (born 1986), Dutch footballer
Derk Cheetwood (born 1973), American actor
Derk Droze (born 1972), American soccer player
Derk Rijkens (born 1975), Dutch cricketer
Derk Gerard Willem Spitzen (1896-1957), Dutch politician
Derk Jan Eppink (born 1958), Dutch journalist
Jacob Derk Carel van Heeckeren (1730-1795), Baron of Ruurlo

Dutch masculine given names